Enzo Ferrari (1898-1988) was the founder of Ferrari NV and Scuderia Ferrari.

Enzo Ferrari may also refer to:

People
 Enzo Ferrari (footballer) (born 1942) Italian soccer player/manager
 Enzo Ferrari (Chilean footballer) (born 1979) Chilean football player/manager

Places
 Museo Casa Enzo Ferrari, Modena, Italy
 Autodromo Enzo e Dino Ferrari, Imola, Italy

Automotive
 Ferrari F140 Enzo Ferrari (Ferrari Enzo streetcar), 2002-2004 supercar
 Ferrari FXX (Ferrari Enzo racecar) 2005-2007 track car
 Ferrari F140 engine (Ferrari Enzo engine)

Other uses
 Enzo Ferrari (film), a film under development by Michael Mann

See also

 Ferrari (disambiguation)
 Enzo (name)